The St. Paul Rodeo Hall of Fame is a cowboy hall of fame. Established in 1998, the hall of fame was created to honor those individuals who, throughout its history, made significant contributions or distinguished themselves in their performances to the rodeo. Inductees include champions, stock contractors, committee personnel, and livestock.

Inductees 

2019
 Elaine Smith
 Bob Gregory
 Grant McKillip
 Richard Ernst
 Butch Knowles

2018
 Charly Crawford
 A.J. Swaim
 Smith & Velvet
 Sam & Claudia (Ernst) Smith
 Dick & Eileen Buyserie

2017
 Joe Ruda
 Frank & Rita Foltz
 Shirley Ernst
 Trevor Knowles
Red Rock (Livestock)

2016
 Tex Irwin
 Norm Berhorst
 Bill Smith
 Cindy Smith
 Lottie Smith

2015
 Charles Soileau
 Art McKay
 Nancy Schneider
 John & Karren Pohlschneider

2014
 Mel Hyland
 Justin McKee
Flint Rasmussen
 Lawrence Bunning
 Jean Manegre

2013
 Steve Johnson
 Chuck Lopeman
 Lloyd Faria
 Bill Dolan
 Al Pohlschneider

2012
Fred Whitfield
 Sonny Hansen
 Loren Obrist/Rollin' Acres
 Don Coleman
 Don Ferschweiler

2011
 Clay Finley
 Les Johnson
 Mary Ann Zielinski
 Ed Brentano
 Bill Smith, Sr.

2010
 Joe Beaver
 Rod Hay
 Joe Baumgartner
 Maurice Smith
 Jerry Halter

2009
 Bill Nelson
 Mike Beers
 Buck & Jason Smith
 Mary McKay
 Carl J. Smith

2008
 Bill Halter
 Roger & Brenda Howard
 Jerri Mann
Rob Smets
 Dwight Maddox

2007
 John Weisz
 Buddy Schneider
 Gary Simon
 Western Rodeos
 Jackie Wright

2006
 Rudy Doucette
 Jim Bothum
 Don Kish
 Jim Gooding
 Pat Smith

2005
Bob Tallman
 Steve Coleman
 Doug Brown
 Donna Smith
 Jimmie Cooper

2004
 Ted McKillip
 Clay Cooper
 Judy Ackley
 Ray Richardson
 Stub Johnson

2003
 Bruce Ford
 Pat Nogle
 Wick Peth
 Bill Miller
 George Bernards

2002
 Cy Ferschweiler
 John Growney
 Dee McKillip
 Dean Oliver
 Enoch Walter

2001
 John McKillip, Sr.
 Joe Alexander
 Bob Ragsdale
 Wilbur Plaugher
 Tony Halter

2000
 Christensen Brothers
 Maureen Coleman
 Gene Smith
 Harry Tompkins
 Harry Charters

1999
 Ray Manegre
Charmayne James
 Harley Tucker
 Buddy Groff
Jim Shoulders

1998
 William Smith
 Mel Lambert
 Anne K. Smith
Larry Mahan
Gene Rambo

Source:

References

External links 
 Official Website

1998 establishments in Oregon
Cowboy halls of fame
Halls of fame in Oregon
Sports halls of fame
Sports hall of fame inductees
Awards established in 1998
Museums established in 1998
Lists of sports awards